Der Jude  (The Jew) was a monthly magazine in German founded by Martin Buber and Salman Schocken. It was published from 1916 to 1928.

History
The paper was established by Martin Buber. Contributors included Max Mayer (1886–1967), Max Mayer Präger (1889–1942), Gustav Krojanker (1891–1945), Ernst Simon, and Siegmund Kaznelson. It appeared monthly in 1916–1928 and was published by R. Löwit Verlag (Berlin/Vienna). During the last two years it appeared irregularly. It was circulated in 3000–5000 copies.

Buber's was the third magazine bearing this title. Gottfried Selig had published a different magazine from 1768 to 1772, and Gabriel Riesser edited a magazine of the same name from 1832. A fourth magazine of this name was published weekly in New York from 1895 in German.

In 1903-1904, Buber announced plans for a magazine by this name, subtitled "Revue der jüdischen Moderne" (Review of Modern Judaism), which he hoped to put out together with Chaim Weizmann, Berthold Feiwel, E. M. Lilien, and Davis Trietsch under the auspices of Jüdischer Verlag. A prospectus, composed by Buber, was printed and distributed, but for financial reasons the plans for publication fell through.

References

Further reading
 Martin Buber, Die Losung. Zur Programmatik der Zeitschrift "Der Jude", in: Der Jude 1/1, April 1916.
 Eleonore Lappin (ed.), Der Jude 1916–1928. Jüdische Moderne zwischen Universalismus und Partikularismus, Mohr Siebeck, Tübingen 2000, Reviews at Perlentaucher.
 Aufbau, November 2008, ps. 18 ff.

External links
 

1916 establishments in Germany
1928 disestablishments in Germany
Defunct magazines published in Germany
German-language magazines
Monthly magazines published in Germany
Jewish magazines
Magazines established in 1916
Magazines disestablished in 1928
Magazines published in Berlin
Irregularly published magazines published in Germany